LEMO is an electronic and fiber optic connector manufacturer, based in Écublens, Switzerland. It is known for producing the push-pull connectors. LEMO connectors are used in medical, industrial, audio/visual, telecommunications, military, scientific research and measurement applications. The company, founded in 1946, started as a manufacturer of contacts in noble and rare metals. The company took its name from the company founder, engineer Léon Mouttet.

LEMO has set several connector standards. The 3K.93C connector has been adopted by the American (SMPTE 304M), Japanese (ARIB BTAS-1005B) and European (EBU R100-1999) standards organisations for HDTV fiber links for the broadcast market.

While LEMO connectors were generally developed as proprietary designs, the legal status of many of the older designs is not clear. For example, the LEMO website itself shows a standardisation date of 1970 for the LEMO 00 model. The "chocolate plate" design of the connector's shell grip is, however, trademarked.

LEMO's REDEL connectors are used in medical and aviation environments. Most Cirrus aircraft use REDEL 6-pin connectors.

In July 2014, LEMO acquired Northwire Inc., a US specialty cable manufacturer of wire and multi-conductor cable and retractiles for the medical, aerospace and defense, energy, and industrial markets. The acquisition of Northwire allows LEMO to provide a complete cable-connector solution.

LEMO holds two addresses in Japan (Tokyo and Osaka), another one in Singapore, and two in the USA. LEMO also holds offices in Vienna and Budapest.

In 1994, LEMO entered into Chinese market through a distributor. In 2004 LEMO set up a subsidiary company in Shanghai. Besides Shanghai, LEMO China has offices in more than 14 cities, they are as follows: Beijing, Guangzhou, Shenzhen, Tianjin, Changsha, Chengdu, Wuhan, Taiyuan, Harbin, Changchun, Shenyang, Xi'an, Nanjing and Zhengzhou.

In Écublens, one of 3 offices in Switzerland, R&D is performed in a test laboratory with a climatic chamber.

References

External links
 Official website

RF connectors